Mónica Fernández may refer to:

 Mónica Fernández-Aceytuno (born 1961), Spanish biologist and writer
 Mónica Fernández Balboa (born 1966), Mexican politician
 Mónica Fernández (gymnast), Argentine competitor at the 2003 Trampoline World Championships
 Toti Fernández (born 1968), Guatemalan athlete